Gay Lesbian Info Centre is a lesbian, gay and bisexual rights charity in the Serbia. It was formed in 2009 by Predrag Azdejković, Serbian gay journalist, Blogger and writer to promote LGBT right through media, culture and art, to collect information on LGBT human right and violation of LGBT human rights, recognise and promote good practices regarding promotion of LGBT human rights and cooperate with media, media associations, cultural organizations and government institutions.

Current work
Regional Gay Lesbian Info Portal – GayEcho
GayEcho is regional gay lesbian info portal that covers Croatia, Bosnia and Herzegovina, Montenegro and Serbia. It was formed in 2001. Media analysis for 2009 showed that GayEcho was one of the most mentioned websites in Serbian media.

Merlinka – International queer film festival
In December 2009, Gay Lesbian Info Centre organized the first Merlinka festival. Five hundred people visited the festival and ten films were screened. The festival was public, announced in the media and there were no incidents. In February 2010 the festival received the Crystal Award for the best Youth project in 2009.

Gay magazine Optimist
In July 2011, Gay Lesbian Info Centre published the first issue of Optimism magazine, that was changed into Optimist after the first issue. Every second month Optimist is printed and distributed for free in gay clubs and bars in Serbia. The magazine is also available online.

See also

LGBT rights in Serbia
List of LGBT rights organisations

References

External links
GLIC – Gay Lesbian Info Centre
Regional gay lesbian info portal GayEcho
Merlinka festival
Optimist magazine
Gay Serbia Guide

LGBT organizations in Serbia
2009 establishments in Serbia